Nemanthus annamensis, commonly known as the gorgonian wrapper, is a species of sea anemone found in central Indo-Pacific waters.

Description
Nemanthus annamensis has a rather variably-shaped base and low, spreading column, widening slightly just below the oral disc. This bears 120 to 130 tentacles, the inner ones longer than the outer, and a slit-shaped mouth with two siphonoglyphs. The column and tentacles are white, yellowish or orange, variegated with dark patches, and the oral disc is semi-transparent.

Distribution and habitat
Nemanthus annamensis is native to the Indo-Pacific area. It was first described from the Gulf of Tonkin: annamensis signifies "of Annam", a historical name for central and northern Vietnam. It has also been found in the Indian Ocean off the coast of Kenya. It is known as the "gorgonian wrapper" because of its habit of attaching itself by its base and wrapping itself around the branches of gorgonians, the coral-like sea whips and sea fans (illustration below).

Ecology
Nemanthus annamensis has been found living in association with the crab Lauridromia intermedia. Crabs in the family Dromiidae are often known as "sponge crabs" due to their habit of carrying bits of sponge, and occasionally other objects, on their carapace. In this instance, the crab was carrying a specimen of Nemanthus annamensis, holding it in place with cheliped-like structures on the end of its fourth and fifth pairs of legs. The sea anemone was not attached to the crab's shell and seemed to be happy with being carried around as it extended its tentacles in a normal manner. It would seem that the crab uses the anemone as camouflage or takes advantage of the anemone's nematocysts as a defence against predators.

Nemanthus annamensis is a host of the parasite Gastroecus caulleryi, a copepod.

References

Nemanthidae
Animals described in 1943